Stig Patrik Sandström (born 26 February 1967) is a Swedish Olympic sailor. He finished 17th in the 49er event at the 2000 Summer Olympics together with John Harrysson.

References

Swedish male sailors (sport)
Olympic sailors of Sweden
49er class sailors
Royal Gothenburg Yacht Club sailors
Sailors at the 2000 Summer Olympics – 49er
1967 births
Living people
Place of birth missing (living people)